Dennis Lajola (born December 2, 1989) is an American professional tennis player.

He was born in the Philippines and currently makes his home in `Aiea, Honolulu, Hawaii.

Education
He attended the University of Hawaii and received the Western Athletic Conference (WAC) player of the year award in 2011, the first University of Hawaii student to receive that honor. He was on the all-WAC first team all four years at the University.

Tennis career
Dennis has played mostly Futures and Challengers, reaching the quarter-, semi-, and finals of a number of events, won 2007 Oceanic Time Warner Cable Honolulu Futures tennis tournament at the University of Hawai'i courts. He qualified for the 2012 SAP Open in San Jose, California. He lost his first main-draw match to Bulgarian Dimitar Kutrovsky, another qualifier.

Personal life
He has two older brothers, Derrick and Darryl, and an older sister, Tiffaney. Derrick is also a tennis player and is currently women's tennis assistant coach at the University of Hawaii.

References
ITF player page

American male tennis players
1989 births
Living people
Hawaii Rainbow Warriors and Rainbow Wahine athletes
College men's tennis players in the United States